Zinc finger X-chromosomal protein is a protein that in mammals is encoded by the ZFX gene of the X chromosome.

Function
This gene on the X chromosome is structurally similar to a related gene on the Y chromosome. It encodes a member of the krueppel C2H2-type zinc-finger protein family. The full-length protein contains an acidic transcriptional activation domain (AD), a nuclear localization sequence (NLS) and a DNA binding domain (DBD) consisting of 13 C2H2-type zinc fingers. Studies in mouse embryonic and adult hematopoietic stem cells showed that this gene was required as a transcriptional regulator for self-renewal of both stem cell types, but it was dispensable for growth and differentiation of their progeny. Multiple alternatively spliced transcript variants encoding different isoforms have been identified, but the full-length nature of some variants has not been determined. [provided by RefSeq, May 2010]

References

Further reading